Ivanovo is a city in Russia.

Ivanovo may also refer to:
Ivanovo Oblast, a federal subject of Russia
Ivanovo, Blagoevgrad Province, a village in Blagoevgrad Province, Bulgaria
Ivanovo, Haskovo Province, a village in Haskovo Province, Bulgaria
Ivanovo, Shumen Province, in Shumen Province, Bulgaria
Ivanovo, Smolyan Province, in Smolyan Province, Bulgaria
Ivanovo, Ruse Province, a village in Ruse Province, Bulgaria (notable for its UNESCO listed Rock-hewn Churches of Ivanovo)
Ivanovo Municipality, a municipality in Ruse Province, Bulgaria
Ivanovo, Croatia, a village in Viljevo Municipality, Croatia
Ivanovo, Russia, several inhabited localities in Russia
Ivanovo, Serbia, a village in Pančevo Municipality, Serbia
Ivanava (Ivanovo), a town in Belarus

See also
Ivan (disambiguation)
Ivanov (disambiguation)

Ivanovsky (disambiguation)
The Composers' House in Ivanovo